Tir Jari (also Romanized as Tīr Jārī) is a village in Garmab Rural District, Chahardangeh District, Sari County, Mazandaran Province, Iran. At the 2006 census, its population was 31, in 5 families.

References 

Populated places in Sari County